The Kansas State Wildcats football program is a college football team that represents Kansas State University in the Big 12 Conference in the National Collegiate Athletic Association.  The team has had 32 head coaches and one interim head coach since its first official football game in 1896. The current coach is Chris Klieman, who was hired prior to the 2019 season.

The university adopted the nickname "Wildcats" in 1915 after being previously known as the "Aggies."  Head coach Zora G. Clevenger changed the team's nickname to the "Farmers" from 1916 to 1919, but it was changed back to "Wildcats" permanently in 1920 by coach Charlie Bachman.

Kansas State joined the Missouri Valley Intercollegiate Athletic Association in 1913. The school split away from the MVIAA with five others to create the Big Six Conference in 1928.  Through the years that conference added two teams and eventually became the Big Eight Conference.  The Wildcats became a charter member of the Big 12 in 1996 when the Big Eight disbanded.

Four coaches have led Kansas State to postseason bowl games: Jim Dickey, Bill Snyder, Ron Prince and Chris Klieman. Four coaches have won conference championships with the Wildcats: Mike Ahearn (1909, 1910); Guy Lowman (1912); Pappy Waldorf (1934); and Snyder (2003, 2012).

Bill Snyder is the all-time leader in seasons coached at KSU with 27, more than triple the next highest. Snyder is also the leader in games coached (333, almost four times the next highest) and total wins (215, more than five times the next highest). Mike Ahearn has the highest overall winning percentage of any Wildcat coach, at .755 over his six seasons. Sam Francis is the worst coach in program history in terms of winning percentage, as he lost every one of the ten games he coached during his only season at Kansas State.  Among coaches who served more than one season, Stan Parrish has the lowest winning percentage (.076) after completing three seasons with a record of 2–30–1.  Bill Snyder, Charles Bachman and Pappy Waldorf have been inducted into the College Football Hall of Fame as coaches. Coaches Zora G. Clevenger, Alvin "Bo" McMillin and Sam Francis were inducted in the College Football Hall of Fame as players. Snyder is the only coach to have won major post-season national coach of the year honors while at Kansas State.

Key

Coaches
Statistics correct as of 2022 NCAA Division I FBS football season.

See also

 List of Kansas State University people

Notes

References
General

 
 

Specific

Lists of college football head coaches

Kansas sports-related lists